is a national highway of Japan that traverses the prefectures of Aomori and Hokkaido, as well as the Tsugaru Strait that separates them. The  highway begins at an intersection with National Route 5 in Hakodate, then crosses the Tsugaru Strait on a ferry from Hakodate to Ōma, Aomori, that it shares with National Route 279, where it then travels south through eastern Aomori Prefecture, passing through the city of Mutsu before ending at an intersection with National Route 4 in Noheji.

Route description

Hakodate
National Route 279 begins at an intersection with National Route 5 in central Hakodate, east of Hakodate Station. The highway travels southwest through the city, then curves to the northwest, and turns northeast towards the former site of the city's ferry terminal, which was moved to the northwest of Hakodate Station. The highway's brief  route in Hokkaido ends at the former terminal, which has since been converted into a retail area. Aside from the last  of the highway near the ferry terminal, the highway also carries the Main Line of the Hakodate City Tram in its median.

Aomori Prefecture

The highway is then carried south across the Tsugaru Strait via the Tsugaru Kaikyō Ferry to Ōma on the northern tip of Aomori Prefecture's Shimokita Peninsula. From the route's northern terminus in Hakodate to Ōma, National Route 338 runs concurrent with National Route 279; however, in Ōma, National Route 338 leaves the concurrency, traveling south while Route 279 heads southeast towards Mutsu. In Aomori, Route 279 is known as the Mutsu Hamanasu Line, named after the hamanasu, known in English as the Rosa rugosa, a shrub-like rose that grows on the beaches of Japan.

In Mutsu, it intersects with the northern end of the Mutsu Bypass, an auxiliary parallel route of the highway, and routes 279 and 338 briefly meet again, sharing a short concurrency. After traveling through the central district of the city together, National Route 338 leaves National Route 279 at the southern end of the Mutsu Bypass. It continues its path southeast across the peninsula while National Route 279 heads south towards Yokohama, and eventually Noheji at the southern base of the peninsula. The highway reaches a rest area on the north shore of the Miho River in Yokohama. Between Yokohama and Noheji, National Route 279 is closely paralleled by the Shimokita Expressway, a highway signed as an auxiliary route of National Route 279 that has supplanted the original route as the main thoroughfare between Yokohama and Noheji. The two highways meet at junction in southern Yokohama, where the original route continues south along Mutsu Bay while the expressway takes a more inland route through the village of Rokkasho. Upon entering Noheji, the route travels southwest through sparsely populated coastal woodlands before entering the central part of the town where it curves to the south. After passing by the town hall, the route terminates at an intersection with National Route 4.

Average daily traffic
National Route 279 is maintained by the Road Bureau of the Ministry of Land, Infrastructure, Transport and Tourism (MLIT), which conducts surveys on the Japan's national routes and expressways every five years to measure their average daily traffic. In 2015, the most utilized point along the route, was at the junction between it and Aomori Route 7 in Mutsu, where a daily average of 9,440 vehicles traveled on National Route 279. The least busy section of the highway was between the ferry terminal at Ōma and the intersection where the highway meets National Route 338, it carried an average of only 1,337 vehicles.

History

It traveled between Noheji-shukuba and the Buddhist temple and folk religion pilgrimage destination of Mount Osore, believed to be a mystical gate to the underworld in both Ainu mythology and Japanese Buddhism, near the former town of Tanabu (now part of Mutsu). The road appears on maps as early as 1647, and by 1699 it was labeled as the Tanabu-kaidō on a map produced by the Nanbu. Pilgrimages along the Tanabu-kaidō to Mount Osore date back to 862, but its uncertain if the establishment of a maintained road took place before the Nanbu built it.

National Route 279 was established by the Cabinet of Japan in 1970 along the Tanabu-kaidō between Noheji and Ōma, the ferry linking Ōma and Hakodate, and the short section in Hakodate. Since its designation, bypasses of the original route have been built, these include the incomplete, limited-access Shimokita Expressway between Noheji and Yokohama, as well as the Nimaibashi Bypass in Mutsu.

Incidents and closures
On 1 February 2012, a blizzard trapped 329 people on the highway in Aomori Prefecture. On 9 August 2021, most of a bridge over the Koaka River on the northern edge of Mutsu was washed away during Tropical Storm Lupit. No people were harmed as a result of the bridge collapse; however, it cut off direct highway access to Mutsu for the residents of Ōma and Kazamaura until a signalized one-lane bridge was built on 20 June 2022 to the south of the original to partially restore the connection.

Major intersections

Auxiliary routes

Shimokita Expressway

The Shimokita Expressway is an incomplete two-lane national expressway in Aomori Prefecture that is signed as an auxiliary route of National Route 279. The expressway travels south from Yokohama through the municipalities of Rokkasho and Noheji, where the main section of the expressway currently ends at an interchange with National Route 4. A short expressway stub opened in Mutsu in December 2019. When completed, the expressway will stretch  from Mutsu south to the town of Shichinohe.

Mutsu Bypass
The Mutsu Bypass is a  auxiliary route of National Route 279 in the central district of Mutsu. From its northern terminus with its parent route, it heads southeast and crosses over the Jotachi River. It has a junction with the Ōminato Bypass, an auxiliary route of National Route 338. After this junction the Mutsu Bypass travels south, paralleling the main line of National Route 279 until it reaches its southern terminus at the junction of National Routes 279 and 338.

See also

References

External links
 National Route 279

279
Roads in Aomori Prefecture
Roads in Hokkaido